The Gürsel Aksel Sports and Healthy Life Center, colloquially known as Gürsel Aksel Stadium is a football stadium located in Üçkuyular, Göztepe, a neighbourhood in the Konak district of İzmir, Turkey. The stadium is the home ground of İzmir-based sports club Göztepe S.K.

The stadium is commemorated after Gürsel Aksel who served entirely to club during his professional career, officially dubbed as "the great captain" by the club.

History

Göztepe S.K. announced their agreement with TOKI, governmental housing agency of Turkey, for construction of a stadium on 22 February 2017. Groundbreaking of stadium was 9 September 2017. Stadium is planned to be built total of 12 thousand m2. Initial projected capacity of stadium was announced as 20,035. In July 2019, projected capacity was increased up to 25,035. In 2020,  the construction cost of the stadium  was reported by Anadolu Agency as 218,900,000.00 ₺.

The first ever season tickets of the stadium were released on 8 November 2019, covering the second half of the 2019–20 Süper Lig season.

The stadium was opened on 26 January 2020, Monday, at 16:00 local time, at the week 19 game of 2019–20 Süper Lig season, between Göztepe and Beşiktaş J.K. The game ended 2–1 in favour of Göztepe S.K. On 25th minute of the game, Halil Akbunar scored the first goal ever scored in Gürsel Aksel Stadium. 17,855 spectators attended the opening game.

Turkish Football Federation announced their decision on 14 April 2021, revealing that 2020–21 Turkish Cup Final to take place at Gürsel Aksel Stadium. Played on 18 May 2021 between Antalyaspor and Beşiktaş, the game ended with 0–2 final score, sealing the cup title of Beşiktaş.

Facilities
Final layout of Gürsel Aksel Stadium lies on 34.651 m2 of building area with a total construction presence of 94.541 m2. There is the official sports museum of Göztepe S.K., exhibition halls, food courts and a parking garage located inside and underground of the stadium. On the roof of stadium, there is a 650 metres long walking track built.

Transportation
As of 2020 information, stadium is accessible via ESHOT bus services with related connections of bus numbers 5, 6, 7, 24, 25 and 480 from Balçova, Narlıdere districts and Kavacık and Oyunlar Köyü neighbourhoods, bus number 486 from Oyak Sitesi neighbourhood, bus numbers 17, 650, 671, 690 and 873  from surrounding high ways, bus number 510 from Gaziemir district, bus number 202 from Adnan Menderes Airport.

References

External links

Göztepe S.K. website

 
2020 establishments in Turkey
Sports venues in İzmir
Football venues in Turkey
Multi-purpose stadiums in Turkey
Sports venues completed in 2020
Konak District